Barnwell Regional Airport  is a county-owned, public-use airport located  northwest of the central business district of Barnwell, a city in Barnwell County, South Carolina, United States. It is owned by Barnwell County. The airport serves the general aviation community, with no scheduled commercial airline service.

History 
The airport was built by the United States Army Air Forces and opened in May 1943. Barnwell Army Airfield was  a satellite airfield of Columbia Army Air Base, supporting B-25 Mitchell medium bomber training for Third Air Force III Air Support Command. Training was accomplished by 44th Station Complement Squadron which also maintained the facility.  After the war, the airfield was turned over to local authorities which converted it into a civil airport.

Facilities and aircraft 

For the 12-month period ending 29 October 2018, the airport had 5,750 aircraft operations, an average of 16 per day: 80% general aviation, 7% air taxi, and 13% military. At that time there were 26 aircraft based at this airport, all of them single-engine.

See also 

 South Carolina World War II Army Airfields
 List of airports in South Carolina

References 

 
 Manning, Thomas A. (2005), History of Air Education and Training Command, 1942–2002.  Office of History and Research, Headquarters, AETC, Randolph AFB, Texas

External links
 

1943 establishments in South Carolina
Airports in South Carolina
Buildings and structures in Barnwell County, South Carolina
Transportation in Barnwell County, South Carolina
Airports established in 1943
Airfields of the United States Army Air Forces in South Carolina